Bear Grillz is an American electronic dance music DJ and record producer based in Denver, Colorado. He appeared on The Jerry Springer Show to reveal his identity, which was previously hidden in a bear costume. Using a MacBook Pro, he watched music production tutorials on YouTube prior to developing his musical career.

Discography

Studio albums

Extended plays

Singles 
 2014: "#Thirsty"
 2017: "The Game" (featuring Figure)
 2018: "Mayweather"
 2018: "Drop That"
 2018: "Wicked"
 2018: "Take Me Away"
 2019: "Out Of My Body" (featuring Karra)
 2019: "The Way We Were" (with Haliene)
 2020: "Smile Without U" (featuring Nevve)
 2020: "Save Us From Ourselves" (Arknights Soundtrack) (featuring Micah Martin)
 2020: "Turning Point"
 2020: "Fire"
 2020: "Where We Are" (with Adventure Club and JT Roach)
 2020: "Scumbag" (with Dion Timmer featuring Atarii)
 2020: "Run It" (with Riot Ten featuring Bok Nero)

References 

American DJs
American electronic musicians
Musicians from Denver
American dance musicians
Year of birth missing (living people)
Living people
Electronic dance music DJs
Monstercat artists